Lomographa lungtanensis is a moth in the family Geometridae first described by Wehrli in 1939. It is found in Taiwan and China.

References

Moths described in 1939
Lomographa
Moths of Taiwan
Moths of Asia